The 2009 Women's Australian Hockey League was the 17th edition women's field hockey tournament. The tournament was held between 27 February – 5 April 2009 at various venues, before culminating in Melbourne for the finals.

NSW Arrows won the tournament for the eighth time after defeating QLD Scorchers 5–3 in the final. WA Diamonds finished in third place after defeating Canberra Strikers 2–0 in the third and fourth place playoff.

Participating Teams

Canberra Strikers
NSW Arrows
NT Pearls
QLD Scorchers
Southern Suns
Tassie Van Demons
VIC Vipers
WA Diamonds

Competition format
The 2008 Women's Australian Hockey League consisted of a single round robin format, followed by classification matches. 

Teams from all 8 states and territories competed against one another throughout the pool stage. At the conclusion of the pool stage, the top four ranked teams progressed to the semi-finals, while the bottom four teams continued to the classification stage.

Point Allocation
All matches had an outright result, meaning drawn matches were decided in either golden goal extra time, or a penalty shoot-out. Match points were as follows:

· 3 points for a win
· 1 points to each team in the event of a draw
· 1 point will be awarded to the winner of the shoot-out
· 0 points to the loser of the match

Results

Preliminary round

Fixtures

Classification round

Fifth to eighth place classification

Crossover

Seventh and eighth place

Fifth and sixth place

First to fourth place classification

Semi-finals

Third and fourth place

Final

Awards

Statistics

Final standings

Goalscorers

References

External links

2009
2009 in Australian women's field hockey